Lake of Bays is a township municipality within the District Municipality of Muskoka, Ontario, Canada. During the 2016 census, the township had a population of 3,167 and encompassed  of land.

Located in the northeast corner of Muskoka, the Lake of Bays offers a natural landscape of forests, rocks, lakes and wetlands. It is an important cottaging, recreation and tourism destination in Ontario. Currently, the economy of the township is primarily based on tourism, recreation, and the service sector with forestry and aggregate (composite) extraction contributing as well.

History 

The Township of Lake of Bays was established in 1971 from the former Townships of Franklin, Ridout, McLean and Sinclair/Finlayson (unorganized) as one of six area municipalities within the District of Muskoka.

In the early 20th century several grand resort hotels opened on the lake, among them the Wawa (built in 1908 and destroyed by fire in 1923) and the Bigwin Inn, a resort that operated on Bigwin Island from 1920 until the late 1960s. These hotels were sought after destinations for many rich and famous individuals and groups at the time, including Hollywood stars like Clark Gable, writers like Ernest Hemingway and, during the Second World War, the Dutch royal family.

The township was once home to the smallest commercial railway line in the world called the Portage Railway. Between 1904 and 1958 it ferried passengers between North Portage on Peninsula Lake to South Portage on Lake of Bays, a distance of 2 km.  The train, named the Portage Flyer, was discontinued in 1958 and was relocated to an amusement park near St. Thomas, Ontario, until 1984. Much of the original components have since been repatriated and continue to operate on the grounds of Muskoka Heritage Place near Huntsville.

Communities
The township includes the communities of Baysville, Bigwin, Birkendale, Bona Vista, Bondi Village, Britannia, Brooks Mills, Browns Brae, Dorset, Dwight, Fox Point, Glenmount, Grandview, Grassmere, Grove Park, Hillside, Limberlost Lodge, Lumina, Maple Ridge, Millar Hill (ghost town), Nith Grove, North Portage, Norway Point, Port Cunnington, Sea Breeze, South Portage and Wahawin.

A small community developed on the subdivided landholdings of a sawmill built by William Brown in the 1870s. The economic development of Baysville was enabled by good road and steamboat connections. Baysville developed into a popular region for vacationers and sportsmen.

Local bodies of water 
 Cooper Lake
 Echo Lake
 Ellis Lake
 Lake of Bays
 Oxtongue River
 Peninsula Lake
Ril Lake
 Rusynyk Bay
 Tackaberry Lake

Demographics 

In film

The 1949 FitzPatrick Traveltalk Ontario: Land of Lakes includes a segment on Bigwin Inn.

In 1963 the former Dorset Fire Tower was shown in the opening credits of the old CBC TV show The Forest Rangers. The tower can also be seen in the 1999 Canadian documentary Over Canada: An Aerial Adventure.

The lake scenes from the Canadian film starring Gordon Pinsent called Away From Her were also shot in the township on the south shore of Lake of Bays across from Price's Point.

Notable residents 
Art Asbury, speed boat racer and one-time world speed record holder.

See also
List of townships in Ontario
Limberlost Forest and Wildlife Reserve

References

External links

 

Lower-tier municipalities in Ontario
Municipalities in the District Municipality of Muskoka
Township municipalities in Ontario